The Aroser Rothorn is the highest mountain of the Plessur Alps. It is located between Arosa and Lenzerheide in the canton of Graubünden and with a summit elevation of 2,980 metres above sea level. The summit lies near the Parpaner Rothorn, which is served by a cable car.

See also
List of mountains of Graubünden
List of most isolated mountains of Switzerland

References

External links

 Aroser Rothorn on Hikr

Mountains of the Alps
Mountains of Switzerland
Mountains of Graubünden
Two-thousanders of Switzerland
Albula/Alvra
Arosa
Lantsch/Lenz